MigVax-101 is a COVID-19 vaccine candidate developed by Oravax Medical.

References 

Clinical trials
Israeli COVID-19 vaccines
Virus-like particle vaccines